@Gina Yei: #WithAllMyHeartAndMore is a Puerto Rican comedy-drama streaming television series, produced by Somos Productions and Piñolywood Studios for Walt Disney Company. The series premiered worldwide on Disney+ on January 11, 2023.

Plot  
Songwriter Gina López, also known as "Gina Yei", has been awarded a scholarship to the renowned Instituto Musical del Caribe (IMC) for her extraordinary talent. This is located on the island nation of Puerto Rico, which is generally considered the cradle of reggaeton. The Instituto Musical del Caribe is considered the best address to expand and perfect one's knowledge in the field of Latin American music and skills in various musical and artistic directions. Gina is beside herself with joy that she gets this chance. She dreams of one day writing songs for aspiring and renowned artists, including Jayden, a highly talented up-and-coming musician as well as the son of the institute's director, and putting her thoughts as well as feelings into her lyrics. However, when she starts at the Instituto Musical del Caribe, she quickly discovers that not everything goes as smoothly as she had imagined. Gina witnesses the great pressure of competition as well as the divide between those who adhere to traditional musical forms and those who want to bring in new nuances. While Gina encounters some obstacles and has to deal with issues such as envy, competition and the pressure of fame, she meets Manu, an ambitious young man with whom she shares her passion for music and for whom she gradually develops more and more feelings. Gina still has a lot to learn, but if she trusts herself more and stays true to her principles, she can manage to realize the dream that has accompanied her for a long time.

Cast 
 Didi Romero as Gina López / "Gina Yei"
 Gabriel Tarantini as Manu
 Felipe Albors as Jayden
 Ana Wolfermann as Ruby Rubí
 Angely Serrano as Lucía
 Adriana Fontánez as Vero
 Juliana Rivera as Isa
 Krystal Xamairy as Cami
 Gabriela Santaliz as Miky
 Mía Blakeman Gómez as Amy
 Gerald Manso as El Ángel
 Gustavo Rosas as Dj Noah
 Jacnier Ríos as Luis Diego
 Abdiel Morales as Fabián
 Brian Dean Rittenhouse as Adrián
 José Cancel as Jairo
 José Brocco as Mr. One
 Alfonsina Molinari as Rocío
 Isel Rodríguez as Valentina
 Elí Cay as Salvador
 Wanda Sais as Laura
 Osvaldo Friger as Profesor Hansel
 Krystle Ogando as Profesora Cassandra
 Ashley Rivers as Profesora Aurora
 Lumarie Landrau as Mystery D

Episodes

References

External links 
 
 

Comedy-drama television series
Television shows filmed in Puerto Rico
Television shows set in Puerto Rico
Spanish-language television shows
Disney+ original programming